Hybridisation in gulls occurs quite frequently, although to varying degrees depending on the species involved.

Hybrid large white-headed gulls
 Herring gulls and lesser black-backed gulls interbreed to a limited degree where their ranges overlap, producing birds of intermediate appearance, which could be confused with yellow-legged gull. In North America, this combination is often known as "Appledore gull".
 Western gulls and glaucous-winged gulls hybridise extensively in western North America between Washington and Oregon. This particular hybrid is sometimes known as the "Olympic gull", or "Puget Sound gull". The persistence and backcrossing of hybrids is believed to be due to hybrid superiority, where hybrids exhibit higher evolutionary fitness than parent species in the hybrid zone. 
 Great black-backed gulls and herring gulls have hybridized in eastern North America, particularly the Great Lakes. This hybrid is sometimes known as "Great Lakes gull".
 Herring gulls and glaucous gulls hybridise in Greenland, Iceland and Alaska. The offspring have been termed "Nelson's gull", but are sometimes also known as "Viking gull".
 Herring gulls and glaucous-winged gulls hybridize extensively in southern Alaska. The offspring are sometimes termed "Cook Inlet gull".
 Glaucous-winged gulls and glaucous gulls hybridize in western Alaska. These hybrids are sometimes called "Seward gull".
 Herring gulls and kelp gulls have hybridized in Louisiana. This combination has been termed "Chandeleur gull". This hybrid is interesting as Louisiana is outside of the normal breeding range of both parent species.
It is believed by some that the Kumlien's race of the Iceland gull may be a hybrid population between Iceland gulls and Thayer's gulls. No pure Thayer's gulls are known to occur within the range of Kumlien's although many Kumlien's within their range are almost indistinguishable from Thayer's gulls, while others look like pure Iceland gulls with a range of variation in between.

Hybrids among the smaller gulls
 The most common hybrid found among gulls in Europe is between black-headed gull and Mediterranean gull. Hybrids of this combination are occasionally reported on the northwestern edge of the breeding range of Mediterranean gull.
 Birds have also been reported in Europe which have been suspected of being Mediterranean gull × common gull hybrids; one such gull was seen in Lincolnshire in 2002.
 A bird seen in December 2001 at Belhaven Bay, Lothian, and present each winter since (until at least 2005/6) is believed to be a hybrid between black-headed and common gulls.
 More rarely, hybrids have been reported between laughing gull and black-headed gull, laughing gull and ring-billed gull and possibly black-headed and ring-billed gull. All have been reported from eastern North America.
Common Gull is known to have hybridised with Ring-billed Gull in Northern Ireland.

See also
 Bird hybrid
 Hybridisation in shorebirds
 Hybridisation in terns
 Gamebird hybrids

References

External links
 An article about hybrid gulls breeding in Belgium
Bird Hybrids Database

Gulls
Hybridisation in birds